Joe Adler (born March 29, 1993) is an American actor. He is best known for playing the role of Zart in The Maze Runner and Jason Wylie in The Mentalist.

Filmography

Films

Television

References

External links
 
 

1993 births
Living people
American male film actors
American male television actors